Logan Correctional Center is an Illinois Department of Corrections prison for female offenders in Broadwell Township, Logan County, Illinois, near Lincoln and  north of Springfield. The  prison opened in January 1978. A  plot of fenced land houses general population prisoners. It lies just south of the Lincoln Correctional Center, a facility for male offenders.

Until mid-2000 Illinois had coed prisons, housing both male and female inmates in the same prison. The reason for making Logan Correctional Center a coed prison in 1987 was a fast-growing prison population. When it ended in 2000 it was declared an administrative burden, at the time Logan was supposed to become an all-male prison.

Notable inmates
 Nicole Abusharif – convicted of the 2007 murder of her domestic partner, Rebecca Klein.
 Tanishia Covington - perpetrator of the 2017 Chicago torture incident hate crime
Catherine Suh - charged and found guilty of murder, conspiracy to commit murder, and bribery, for the 1993 murder of her boyfriend Robert O'Dubaine. Sentenced to life in prison.
Marni K. Yang - Charged and found guilty of murdering Shaun Gayle’s girlfriend, Rhoni Reuter.
Christine Roush - Found guilty of murdering her birth mother Ann Poehlman, sentenced to 40 years.  Featured on Snapped series 28.

Conditions 
The conditions of the Logan Correctional Center have been found to be "untenable" based on a study funded by the Department of Justice in November 2016.

References

External links

 Logan Correctional Center

Prisons in Illinois
Buildings and structures in Logan County, Illinois
1978 establishments in Illinois
Buildings and structures completed in 1978